Sâmbăta may refer to the following places in Romania:

 Sâmbăta, a commune in Bihor County 
 Sâmbăta de Sus, a commune in Braşov County 
 Sâmbăta de Jos, a village in Voila, Braşov County
 Sâmbăta Nouă, a village in Topolog, Tulcea County
 Sâmbăta (river)